Richard W. Cottam (1924–1997) was an American political scientist, Iranist and a Central Intelligence Agency (CIA) operative in Iran.

Cottam was a member of the Church of Jesus Christ of Latter-day Saints and served a mission for the Church. He was in the United States Navy during World War II.

References 

 
 
 

1924 births
1997 deaths
Latter Day Saints from Utah
People from Provo, Utah
People of the Central Intelligence Agency
CIA operatives in Iran
American political scientists
American Iranologists
University of Utah alumni
Harvard University alumni
University of Pittsburgh faculty
United States Navy personnel of World War II
Deaths from cancer in Pennsylvania
20th-century political scientists